The men's high jump was one of four jumping events on the Athletics at the 1896 Summer Olympics programme. The high jump was held on 10 April. Five competitors took part in the event, three of them Americans. Ellery Clark, who had previously won the long jump, also won this event. Garrett and Connolly tied for second place.

Background

This was the first appearance of the event, which is one of 12 athletics events to have been held at every Summer Olympics. Fourteen athletes entered, but only five started. This was the only one of the 12 athletics events in 1896 in which there were no Greek competitors. The world record holder was Michael Sweeney, but he had "turned professional in early 1896 and was not eligible."

Competition format

There was a single round of jumping. The bar started at 1.50 metres, increasing 5 centimetres at a time until 1.60 metres and then by 2.5 centimetres at a time. When the victor was the only man left, he was able to choose the height.

Records

There were no standing world records (the IAAF began ratifying records in 1912) or Olympic records (as this was the first Games) before the event. The unofficial world record holder was Michael Sweeney. Ellery Clark set the initial Olympic record at 1.81 metres.

Schedule

The exact time of the contest is not known; it was the second event of the afternoon session, following only the 100 metres final.

Results

All five cleared the bar at 1.50 and 1.55 metres. Hofmann was unable to clear 1.60 metres. Sjöberg made that jump, but could not clear 1.625 metres. All three Americans made that mark and the next, at 1.65 metres, but only Clark was able to clear 1.675 metres. He then cleared 1.70, 1.75, and 1.81 metres successively. Jump sequences are not known

References

Sources
  (Digitally available at la84foundation.org)
  (Excerpt available at la84foundation.org)
 

Men's jump high
High jump at the Olympics